The Division of East Sydney was an Australian Electoral Division in New South Wales. The division was created in 1900 and was one of the original 75 divisions contested at the first federal election. It was abolished in 1969. It was named for the suburb of East Sydney. It was located in the inner eastern suburbs of Sydney, including Darlinghurst, Paddington, Redfern, Surry Hills and Waverley. From 1901 to 1955 the division included Lord Howe Island. After 1910 East Sydney was usually a safe seat for the Australian Labor Party. In the 1930s it was a stronghold of Lang Labor. Its most prominent members were Sir George Reid, who was Prime Minister of Australia in 1904-05, and Eddie Ward, a long-serving Labor member and Cabinet minister.

Members

Election results

References

1901 establishments in Australia
Constituencies established in 1901
East Sydney